Aztlan is supplement published by FASA in 1995 for the cyberpunk role-playing game Shadowrun .

Contents
Aztlan, written by Nigel Findley, details the nation of Aztlan for the Shadowrun setting. Aztlan features a mix of Aztec mythology, cybertech and corporate crime, with chapters on corporate security, religion, fashion, and history.

Reception
In the December 1995 edition of Dragon (Issue #224), Rick Swan thought the blend of Aztec and cyberpunk culture was deft. He found the chapter on religion was "especially good". Swan concluded that this book was "One of the late Nigel Findley's best."

References

Role-playing game supplements introduced in 1995
Shadowrun supplements